Tipulodina is a genus of true crane flies.

Species

T. aetherea (de Meijere, 1916)
T. albiprivata (Edwards, 1926)
T. amabilis (Alexander, 1938)
T. barraudi (Edwards, 1932)
T. bifurcata Xue and Men, 2019
T. brevigladia (Alexander, 1968)
T. brunettiella (Alexander, 1923)
T. cagayanensis Alexander, 1930
T. cantonensis (Alexander, 1938)
T. ceylonica (Edwards, 1927)
T. cinctipes (de Meijere, 1911)
T. contigua (Brunetti, 1918)
T. curtissima (Alexander, 1948)
T. deprivata (Alexander, 1932)
T. dyak (Alexander, 1951)
T. felicita (Alexander, 1968)
T. forficuloides (Alexander, 1957)
T. fumifinis (Walker, 1860)
T. fuscitarsis (Edwards, 1925)
T. gracillima (Brunetti, 1912)
T. hopeiensis (Alexander, 1936)
T. jigongshana Yang, 1999
T. joana (Alexander, 1919)
T. koreana (Baek and Bae, 2016)
T. lumpurensis (Edwards, 1932)
T. luzonica Alexander, 1925
T. magnicornis Enderlein, 1912
T. malabarensis (Alexander, 1960)
T. mcclureana (Alexander, 1968)
T. mckeani (Cockerell, 1929)
T. micracantha Alexander, 1924
T. monozona (Edwards, 1932)
T. nettingi (Young, 1999)
T. nipponica (Alexander, 1923)
T. pampangensis Alexander, 1931
T. patricia (Brunetti, 1912)
T. pedata (Wiedemann, 1821)
T. phasmatodes (Young, 1999)
T. sandersoni (Edwards, 1932)
T. scimitar Alexander, 1924
T. sidapurensis (Edwards, 1932)
T. simianshanensis Men, 2019
T. simillima (Brunetti, 1918)
T. subscimitar (Alexander, 1958)
T. succinipennis Alexander, 1930
T. susainathani (Alexander, 1968)
T. tabuanensis Alexander, 1930
T. taiwanica Alexander, 1923
T. thaiensis (Alexander, 1974)
T. tinctipes (Edwards, 1925)
T. varitarsis (Alexander, 1932)
T. venusta (Walker, 1848)
T. xanthippe (Alexander, 1951)
T. xyris (Alexander, 1949)
T. zetterstedtiana (Alexander, 1971)

References

Tipulidae
Tipuloidea genera